A social deduction game is a game in which players attempt to uncover each other's hidden role or team allegiance. Commonly, these games are played with teams, with one team being considered "good" and another being "bad". During gameplay, players can use logic and deductive reasoning to try to deduce one another's roles, while other players can bluff to keep players from suspecting them.

Examples of social deduction games include Mafia, in which only the mafia know who is mafia and what the mafia players' roles are; Bang!, in which only the sheriff's role is known to everyone; and Secret Hitler, in which only the fascists know who the fascists are, except for the player who plays as Hitler. Other social deduction games include The Resistance, Deception: Murder in Hong Kong and Spyfall.

Social deduction games have been adapted to video games numerous times through mods or full games. One instances of such adaptations are custom maps for StarCraft: Brood War including Changeling and The Thing. These custom maps inspired later Warcraft III custom maps including Mafia, Werewolf, Zerg Infestation, and another Changeling and The Thing. Other notable examples include Garry's Mod "Trouble in Terrorist Town" game mode, Town of Salem, StarCraft II'''s Phantom Mode mod, and Among Us.

One important element of strategy in some social deduction games is determining how long to stick to one's story in the light of information obtained from other players. A Monte Carlo tree search has been suggested for making decisions in social deduction games.

 Notable games 
Board and card gamesMafia (1986)The Werewolves of Millers Hollow (2001)Bang! (2002)The Resistance (2009)Coup (2012)A Fake Artist Goes to New York (2012)Love Letter (2012)Two Rooms and a Boom (2013)Deception: Murder in Hong Kong (2014)Spyfall (2014)Secret Hitler (2016)Witch Hunt (2016)Crossfire (2017)Werewords (2017)Dracula's Feast (2017)The Chameleon (2017)Blood on the Clocktower (2022)

 Video games Space Station 13 (2003)Trouble in Terrorist Town (2009), a modification of Garry's Mod (2006)Mush (2013)
Town of Salem (2014)
Mindnight (2017)
Deceit (2017)
Werewolves Within (2016)
Throne of Lies (2017)
Among Us (2018)
Secret Neighbor, a spin-off of the survival horror stealth game, Hello Neighbor (2018) 
SpyParty (2018)
Gnosia (2019)
Project Winter (2019)
Unfortunate Spacemen (2020)
Goose Goose Duck (2021)
Suspects: Mystery Mansion (2021)
Untrusted (2021)
First Class Trouble (2021)
Impostors, a game mode in Fortnite (2021)
Dread Hunger (2022)
Crimesight (2022)
Among Us VR (2022)

Television
De Mol (1998), Belgian reality game show franchise where one contestant is secretly a Mole. The series has been adapted internationally in various countries, including in the Netherlands under the title Wie is de Mol?, in Poland as Agent, and in the United States, Australia and the United Kingdom as The Mole.
Trapped! (2007), a British children's show where one contestant is secretly a Saboteur
The Hustler (2021), US quiz show where one contestant is secretly given the answers in advance
De Verraders (2021), Dutch gameshow based on Werewolf/Mafia, which has spawned a number of international adaptations, including the British The Traitors  (2022) and the similarly named Australian The Traitors (2022).

See also 
Deduction board game

References